Thamaraikulam Pathi, is one among the Pancha pathi, the five holy places of Ayyavazhi. The Ari Gopalan Citar, who wrote the Akilam was born here. 

Thamaraikulam Pathi was built by (present constructions) Pathi first Guru.Ponnaranainjavan Udaiyakutti in his land. Akilathirattu Ammanai Written by  Arigopalancidar in Thamaraikulam Pathi. This was considered as a Pathi because the Akilam was written down here, which was one among the incarnational activities of Vaikundar. When Ayya Vaikudar came out from the sea (after his first vinchai) he decided and planned to do meditation at here only. This is the first place he visited and started his first pathi. This is the First pathi in the All Pancha pathi's. During the times of Ayya Vaikunder, he was taken once in a year in a Vahana by the devotees to this Pathi.

Prayers and Festivals

Like the other Pathis, the Panividais are conducted thrice a day the special panividais are on every Sundays. The Kodiyettru Thirunal is celebrated here during the Tamil month of Panguni starting from the second Friday of Panguni and last for eleven days. The Thirdu Eadu-vasippu here is celebrated here for seventeen days in the Tamil month of Karthigai. It was at the same time the same festival is conducted in Swamithope pathi. Since the Akilam was written down here, only during this fest the pathi is considered with high sacrament than Swamithope pathi. The Original Palm-leaf version of Akilam is readout here for seven days. Then worshippers as procession, used to bring it to Swamithoppe pathi on last Sunday of the Tamil Month of Karthigai and after completing it reading for seventeen days again return it to Thamaraikulam pathi and complete it by reading the rest in ten days. 

Another important festival celebrated by Ayyavazhi followers centering Thamaraikulam Pathi is the 'Vahana bhavani' (procession carrying Ayya in a Vahana) to Thamaraikulam from Swamithope pathi. It is a One-day-festival celebrated on the last Sunday of Tamil month Panguni. On that day people from Swamithoppe march in great numbers to Muttapathi under the leadership of Payyan carrying Ayya in a Vahana. It was in practice right from the time of Vaikundar.

Location and religious status

This Pathi is located 8 km South-east to Nagercoil 7 km North-west to Kanyakumari. It was also located 2 km south to Swamithope. It also lies 3 km west to the historical Agastheeswaram. There is a direct bus service from Nagercoil and Kanyakumari to here.

This is the place where Ayya commissioned the Citar to write down the Akilam by telling the first sullable of 'The Kappu', of Akilam, it was considered with equal importance with other Pathis. Also Akilam too accredit it as a 'Pathi'.

Architecture and Structure

As all other Pathis, the Palliyarai here forms the inner and the central structure of the whole architecture. An inner corridor, which allows the worshippers to circum-ambulate, surrounds the Palliyarai. In front of this inner corridor, there is a hall in which the prayers are conducted. Sivayu Medai is located in the south-east of Palliyarai.

Administration 
Due to lot of issues now the temple is under administration/control of Hindu Religious and Charitable Endowments Department, however daily panividai and festivals are handled by traditional Thamarai pathi parambarai Guru family members. Now the situation is better since its administrated by Government of Tamilnadu (Hindu Religious and Charitable Endowments Department) and village separatists are not involved in temple administration.

See also

 Pancha pathi
 Ayya Vaikundar
 Pathi
 Ayyavazhi mythology
 List of Ayyavazhi-related articles

References
 Dr. R. Ponnu (2000), Sri Vaikunda Swamigal and Struggle for Social Equality in South India, Ram Publishers.
 G.Patrick (2003), Religion and Subaltern Agency, University of Madras.
 N.Elango & Vijaya Shanthi Elango (1997), Ayya Vaikundar - The Light of the World, Publisher: Authors.
 R. Shunmugam (2001), Nadar Kulathil Narayanar Avatharam, Nadar Kulatheepam Publishers.
https://www.thamaraikulampathi.com/

Holy cities
Pancha pathi